Agabus congener is a species of predatory beetle native to the Palearctic (including Europe) and the Near East. In Europe, it is only found in Andorra, Austria, Belarus, Belgium, Great Britain including Shetland, Orkney, Hebrides and Isle of Man, Bulgaria, Croatia, the Czech Republic, mainland Denmark, Estonia, Finland, mainland France, Germany, mainland Greece, the Republic of Ireland, mainland Italy, Kaliningrad, Latvia, Lithuania, Northern Ireland, North Macedonia, mainland Norway, Poland, Russia, Sardinia, Slovakia, mainland Spain, Sweden, Switzerland, the Netherlands and Ukraine.

Agabus congener can be found in small acidic ponds or mesotrophic fens. This species was identified in samples of organic sediment recovered along with mammoth bones which were excavated in Niederweningen, Switzerland. The presence of this and many other insect species indicates that the sediments formed in a reedy, acidic swamp with shallow mossy pools.

References

External links

Agabus congener at Fauna Europaea
Global Biodiversity Information Facility

congener
Beetles of Europe
Beetles described in 1794